Angus Lees MacDonald (born 15 October 1992) is an English professional footballer who plays as defender for Aberdeen.

Career
MacDonald was born in Winchester, Hampshire. He started his career in the Academy at Reading and spent time on loan at Salisbury City during his scholarship before signing his first professional contract in June 2011. In November 2011, MacDonald joined Conference South club Basingstoke Town on loan, making his debut in a 2–1 FA Trophy win over Sutton United. He joined League Two side Torquay United on loan until the end of the season in February 2012. He made his professional debut for the Gulls in a 1–0 win over Crawley Town. On 30 July 2012, MacDonald joined AFC Wimbledon on a six-month loan deal. However, he was subsequently recalled by Reading on 28 September 2012.

On 22 November MacDonald rejoined Torquay United on loan for six weeks as defensive cover. He made his return to the team as a first-half substitute in the 1–0 defeat to Bradford City on 8 December. On 8 January 2013 MacDonald had his loan extended until the end of the season. Torquay manager Martin Ling described the loan as effectively a trial for MacDonald, with the possibility of a permanent transfer in the summer when his Reading contract expired.

MacDonald was released by Reading on 24 May 2013 after the club confirmed that his contract would not be renewed. He did not win a call into a first team squad while with Reading. Following his release he had trials with Yeovil Town, Birmingham City and Leicester City, but he did not join any of the clubs on a permanent basis.

On 23 August 2013 he joined Salisbury City on a one-year contract. He made his debut three weeks later as a late substitute against Chester but was sent off within minutes for violent conduct. The following month he scored his first goal for the club with an overhead kick, earning Salisbury a 2–1 win over Wrexham.

MacDonald signed for newly relegated Conference Premier club Torquay United on a one-year contract on 21 July 2014. He made 33 appearances, scoring one goal in his first, permanent season at the club and earned a further year contract extension. MacDonald made 48 appearances scoring twice, in a season where he was named club captain under player-manager Kevin Nicholson.

On 2 August 2016, MacDonald signed for Championship club Barnsley. He scored his first goal for the club in an FA Cup tie against Blackpool on 17 January 2017. Barnsley  announced on 3 August 2017 that MacDonald would be the new first team captain.

On 31 January 2018, he signed a two-and-a-half-year deal with Hull City for an undisclosed fee. In 2021, Barnsley had to pay Hull £1 million compensation as they had failed to disclose MacDonald's medical history, with Hull stating they would not have signed him if they knew of it.

Following the end of his Hull City contract, MacDonald signed a two-year deal with Championship club Rotherham United on 15 August 2020. Macdonald left the club at the end of his contract following promotion in the 2021–22 season.

In July 2022, he signed a two-year contract with Swindon Town.

In January 2023, Angus signed a short-term permanent deal with Scottish Premiership club Aberdeen following his release from Swindon Town.

Personal life
MacDonald is of Scottish descent through his grandfather.

MacDonald was diagnosed with early stages of bowel cancer on 4 September 2019. On 19 December 2019, he announced that he had been given the all-clear.

In 2019 MacDonald was in a relationship with singer Alexandra Burke. It was reported that the couple split in October 2020.

Career statistics

References

External links

England profile at the FA

1992 births
Living people
Sportspeople from Winchester
English footballers
England youth international footballers
English people of Scottish descent
Association football defenders
Reading F.C. players
Salisbury City F.C. players
Basingstoke Town F.C. players
Torquay United F.C. players
Barnsley F.C. players
AFC Wimbledon players
Hull City A.F.C. players
Rotherham United F.C. players
Swindon Town F.C. players
English Football League players
National League (English football) players
Southern Football League players
Footballers from Hampshire
Aberdeen F.C. players
Scottish Professional Football League players